The 2014 TEAN International was a professional tennis tournament played on outdoor clay courts. It was the 19th edition of the tournament which was part of the 2014 ATP Challenger Tour and the 14th edition of the tournament for the 2014 ITF Women's Circuit. It took place in Alphen aan den Rijn, Netherlands, on 1 – 7 September 2014.

ATP singles main draw entrants

Seeds

 1 Rankings are as of August 25, 2014.

Other entrants
The following players received wildcards into the singles main draw: 
  Thiemo de Bakker 
  Robin Haase 
  Jelle Sels 
  Igor Sijsling

The following players entered into the singles main draw as alternates:
  Kimmer Coppejans
  Daniel Muñoz de la Nava

The following players received entry from the qualifying draw:
  Moritz Baumann 
  Wesley Koolhof 
  Matwé Middelkoop
  Matthias Wunner

WTA singles main draw entrants

Seeds

 1 Rankings are as of August 25, 2014.

Other entrants 
The following players received wildcards into the singles main draw:
  Inger van Dijkman 
  Quirine Lemoine
  Demi Schuurs
  Mandy Wagemaker 

The following players received entry from the qualifying draw:
  Tatiana Búa
  Catherine Chantraine
  Inés Ferrer Suárez
  Nicola Geuer  
  Deborah Kerfs
  Tamara Korpatsch
  Antonia Lottner  
  Sara Sorribes Tormo 

The following players received entry by a lucky loser spot:
  Jainy Scheepens 
  Natalia Orlova

Champions

Men's singles 

 Jesse Huta Galung def.  Daniel Muñoz de la Nava 6–3, 6–4

Women's singles 
 Denisa Allertová def.  Teliana Pereira 6–3, ret.

Men's doubles 

 Antal van der Duim /  Boy Westerhof def.  Rubén Ramírez Hidalgo /  Matteo Viola 6–1, 6–3

Women's doubles 
 Rebecca Peterson /  Eva Wacanno def.  Richèl Hogenkamp /  Lesley Kerkhove 6–4, 6–4

External links 
 Official website

2014
2014 ATP Challenger Tour
2014 ITF Women's Circuit
2014 in Dutch tennis